This is a list of the 8 members of the European Parliament for Slovenia in the 2019 to 2024 session.

These MEPs were elected at the 2019 European Parliament election in Slovenia.

List 

On the Slovenian Democratic Party-Slovenian People's Party list: (EPP Group)
Milan Zver
Romana Tomc
Franc Bogovič

On the Social Democrats list: (S&D)
Tanja Fajon (2019—2022)
Milan Brglez
Matjaž Nemec (since 2022)

On the List of Marjan Šarec list: (Renew)
Irena Joveva
Klemen Grošelj

On the New Slovenia list: (EPP Group)
Ljudmila Novak

References

See also 

 List of members of the European Parliament, 2019–2024
 2019 European Parliament election
 Politics of Slovenia

2019
Lists of Members of the European Parliament 2019–2024
MEPs for Slovenia 2019–2024